The 1928 Bacharach Giants baseball team represented the Bacharach Giants in the Eastern Colored League (ECL) during the 1928 baseball season. The team compiled a 30–31–2 record (18–12–1 against ECL opponents) and won the ECL pennant.  Dick Lundy was the player-manager. The team played its home games at Bacharach Park in Atlantic City, New Jersey. 

The team's leading batters were:
 Center fielder Chaney White - .371 batting average, .517 slugging percentage, 38 RBIS in 51 games
 Shortstop Dick Lundy - .338 batting average, .498 slugging percentage, 50 RBIs in 54 games
 Left fielder Fats Jenkins - .365 batting average, .464 slugging percentage in 45 games

The team's leading pitchers were Luther Farrell (9–7, 3.63 ERA, 87 strikeouts) and Rats Henderson (8–2, 3.42 ERA, 61 strikeouts).

References

1928 in sports in New Jersey
Negro league baseball seasons